Martin Vrábeľ (born 21 September 1955) is a Czech long-distance runner. He competed in the men's marathon at the 1988 Summer Olympics.

References

1955 births
Living people
Athletes (track and field) at the 1988 Summer Olympics
Czech male long-distance runners
Czech male marathon runners
Olympic athletes of Czechoslovakia
Place of birth missing (living people)